Neon Future III is the fifth studio album by American DJ and producer Steve Aoki. It was released on November 9, 2018, through Ultra Records and Dim Mak Records, serving as the third chapter of Aoki's Neon Future concept albums. A fourth installment of the series, entitled Neon Future IV, it was released in 2020, and features collaborations with Nicky Romero, Play-N-Skillz, TWIIG, Don Diablo and Lush & Simon.

Content
Prior to the album's release, Aoki revealed the meaning of each track in an interview with Billboard magazine. According to him, the album is "really about embracing technology" and "the future of science and ideas, music and humanity. It's just the general overview of a techno future optimist." It includes themes from various genres of music, along with a cameo from Bill Nye on one track. In advance of the album, "Waste It on Me" charted on the Billboard Hot 100.

Track listing

 signifies a co-producer
 signifies an additional producer

Personnel

 Steve Aoki – producer

Additional musicians
 Bill Nye – spoken word in "Noble Gas"
 Matt Skiba – vocals and guitar in "Why Are We So Broken"
 Mark Hoppus – vocals and bass guitar in "Why Are We So Broken" 
 Kim Nam-joon, Jeon Jung-kook, Park Jimin - vocals in "Waste it on Me"  

Other personnel
 Brian Roettinger – art direction, design
 Jamie Stuart – art direction, design
 Brian Ziff – photography

Charts

Album

Singles

Notes

References 

2018 albums
Steve Aoki albums
Electronic dance music albums by American artists
Albums produced by Mac & Phil